Arne Sorensen (21 January 1934 – 19 May 2018) was a Canadian sports shooter. He competed in the 50 metre rifle, three positions event at the 1972 Summer Olympics.

References

1934 births
2018 deaths
Canadian male sport shooters
Olympic shooters of Canada
Shooters at the 1972 Summer Olympics
Shooters at the 1976 Summer Olympics
People from Varde Municipality
Pan American Games medalists in shooting
Pan American Games bronze medalists for Canada
Shooters at the 1971 Pan American Games
20th-century Canadian people